Fotis Mavriplis (31 January 1920 – 9 March 2012) was a Greek alpine skier. He competed in two events at the 1948 Winter Olympics.

References

1920 births
2012 deaths
Greek male alpine skiers
Olympic alpine skiers of Greece
Alpine skiers at the 1948 Winter Olympics
Sportspeople from Thessaloniki